Pape Ibnou Ba (born 5 January 1993) is a professional footballer who plays as a forward for Ligue 2 club Pau, on loan from Le Havre. Born in Senegal, he plays for the Mauritania national team.

Club career
Ba is a youth product of his local club Linguère, and was the record top scorer in a single Senegal Premier League, with 17 goals in the 2015–16 season.

On 3 January 2017, Ba signed for Lebanese Premier League side Ahed, scoring three goals in five matches.

On 29 June 2020, Ba signed with Niort after a prolific stint with Athlético Marseille in the amateur leagues of France. He made his professional debut with Niort in 1–0 Ligue 2 win over En Avant Guingamp on 22 August 2020, scoring his side's only goal of the game.

On 1 September, Ba joins Pau on a one season loan deal.

International career
Born in Senegal, Ba is of Mauritanian descent. He was called up to represent the Mauritania national team for the 2021 Africa Cup of Nations. He debuted with the Mauritania national team in a 0–0 friendly tie with Burkina Faso on 30 December 2021.

References

Honours
Al Ahed
 Lebanese Premier League: 2016–17

External links
 
 
 

1993 births
Living people
Sportspeople from Saint-Louis, Senegal
Citizens of Mauritania through descent
Mauritanian footballers
Mauritania international footballers
Senegalese footballers
Mauritanian people of Senegalese descent
Sportspeople of Senegalese descent
Senegalese people of Mauritanian descent
Sportspeople of Mauritanian descent
Association football forwards
Chamois Niortais F.C. players
Al Ahed FC players
ASC Linguère players
Pau FC players
Ligue 2 players
Championnat National players
Championnat National 2 players
Championnat National 3 players
Lebanese Premier League players
Senegal Premier League players
2021 Africa Cup of Nations players
Mauritanian expatriate footballers
Senegalese expatriate footballers
Expatriate footballers in France
Expatriate footballers in Lebanon
Mauritanian expatriate sportspeople in France
Senegalese expatriate sportspeople in France
Senegalese expatriate sportspeople in Lebanon